Tanner is a 1985 Swiss drama film directed by Xavier Koller. The film was selected as the Swiss entry for the Best Foreign Language Film at the 59th Academy Awards, but was not accepted as a nominee. In 1986, it won the Grand Special Prize at the 25th Karlovy Vary International Film Festival.

Cast
 Otto Mächtlinger as Tanner
 Renate Steiger as Agnes Tanner
 Dietmar Schönherr as Steiner
 Ernst C. Sigrist
 Liliana Heimberg as Anna Tanner
 Susanne Betschaft as Leni Tanner

See also
 List of submissions to the 59th Academy Awards for Best Foreign Language Film
 List of Swiss submissions for the Academy Award for Best Foreign Language Film

References

External links
 

1985 films
1985 drama films
Swiss drama films
1980s German-language films
Films directed by Xavier Koller